Serra Pelada (English: "Naked Mountain Range") is a Brazilian village, district of the municipality of Curionópolis, in the southeast of Pará.

The mine was made infamous by the still images taken by Alfredo Jaar and later by Sebastião Salgado and the first section of Godfrey Reggio's 1988 documentary Powaqqatsi, showing an anthill of workers moving vast amounts of ore by hand. Because of the chaotic nature of the operation estimating the number of miners was difficult, but at least 100,000 people were thought to be present, making it one of the largest mines in the world. Today the Serra Pelada mine is abandoned and the giant open pit that was created by hand has filled with water, creating a small polluted lake.

Discovery
In January 1979, farmer Genésio Ferreira da Silva hired a geologist to investigate whether gold he found on his property was part of a larger deposit. A local child swimming on the banks of a local river found a  nugget of gold. Soon word leaked out that da Silva was indeed sitting upon one of the largest deposits in the world. By the end of the week a gold rush had started with thousands of people descending upon the farm to mine. Five weeks later, there were 10,000 on Ferreira's property and another 12,000 nearby.

At first the only way to get to the remote site was by plane or foot. Miners would often pay exorbitant prices to have taxis drive them from the nearest town to the end of a dirt track; from there, they would walk the remaining distance—some —to the site. The growing town, since it could only be made of material that was carried in by hand, was a collection of haphazard shacks and tents. By May 1980 there were 4,000 such claims.

Military conflict
Early in the history of the mine, the Brazilian military took over operations to prevent exploitation of the workers and conflict between miners and owners. Before the military takeover, basic goods were sold for hugely inflated prices by the mine owners; water cost $3 a litre ($ in ). The infamous Sebastião Rodrigues de Moura (mostly known by his nickname Major Curió) managed the mine for a brief period.

While the military government banned the presence of women and alcohol at the actual mine, the nearby town provided space for women and banned objects. Thousands of women and underage girls engaged in prostitution in exchange for gold. Around 60–80 unsolved murders occurred in the town every month.

Environmental damage
Because of the use of mercury in the gold extraction process large areas around the mine are considered dangerously contaminated. People eating fish downstream from the mine have elevated mercury levels.

In popular media
 Brazilian comedy group Os Trapalhões made in 1982 Os Trapalhões na Serra Pelada, where four friends try to strike it rich at the Serra Pelada mine.
 A documentary video "Gold Lust" created by Neil Hollander in 1984, aired by WNET and narrated by Orson Welles.
 Powaqqatsi, a 1988 documentary film, opens with footage of Serra Pelada
 The Rundown. a 2003 American comedy film, occurs at a fictional mine with many elements based on the Serra Pelada.
 Serra Pelada, 2013 Brazilian action film
 The Salt of the Earth, a 2014 documentary film about Brazilian photographer Sebastião Salgado, whose most iconic works featured the miners of Serra Pelada

Bibliography

Notes

References

  320 pp.
 
 
  280 pp.
 727 pp.
  368 pp.

Gold mines in Brazil
Gold mining in Brazil
Surface mines in Brazil
Geography of Pará
Districts of Brazil